In Greek mythology, Admete (Ancient Greek: Ἀδμήτη means 'the unbroken, unwedded or untamed') was one of the 3,000 Oceanids, daughters of the Titans Oceanus and his sister-wife Tethys. Admete represented unwedded maidens while her sister Zeuxo represented the yoke of marriage. Variations of her name were Admeta or Admeto. The name of Admete/ Admeta was the female form of Admetus.

Mythology 
Along with her other sisters, Admete was one of the companions of Persephone in Sicily when the god Hades abducted the daughter of Demeter.

Notes

References 
Bell, Robert E., Women of Classical Mythology: A Biographical Dictionary. ABC-Clio. 1991. .
Gaius Julius Hyginus, Fabulae from The Myths of Hyginus translated and edited by Mary Grant. University of Kansas Publications in Humanistic Studies. Online version at the Topos Text Project.
Hesiod, Theogony from The Homeric Hymns and Homerica with an English Translation by Hugh G. Evelyn-White, Cambridge, MA.,Harvard University Press; London, William Heinemann Ltd. 1914. Online version at the Perseus Digital Library. Greek text available from the same website.
The Homeric Hymns and Homerica with an English Translation by Hugh G. Evelyn-White. Homeric Hymns. Cambridge, MA.,Harvard University Press; London, William Heinemann Ltd. 1914. Online version at the Perseus Digital Library. Greek text available from the same website.
Kerényi, Carl, The Gods of the Greeks, Thames and Hudson, London, 1951.

Oceanids